

The Nihon Kogata Ku-11 (also known as the Nihon Kogata Army Experimental Transport Glider) was a 1940s experimental Japanese military glider. The Ku-11 was an all-wood high-wing transport glider with two crew and room for 12 fully equipped troops. With little interest from the Imperial Japanese Army the type did not enter production.

Specifications (Ku-11)

See also
List of World War II military gliders

Note

Ku-11
1940s military gliders
World War II Japanese transport aircraft